The Royal Commission on the Northern Environment was established by the Government of Ontario with J. E. J. Fahlgren as Commissioner. The final report and recommendations were submitted to the Ontario Ministry of the Attorney General on June 28, 1985.

Overview
This represented the "largest tract of forest land ever given to a single company". The MOU faced "public outcry" and had to be adandoned.

In response to public outrage on the land grant to a sole company, then Attorney General of Ontario Roy McMurtry on behalf of the Government of Ontario Government of Ontario under then premier, Bill Davis, launched the Royal Commission in 1977. The commission led by J.E.J. Fahlgren was launched in 1977 in response to Commissioners included arc S. Couse as executive director, Ian S. Fraser as director of research, Marlene Brushett as administrator, Lesley Andersen as office manager in  Thunder Bay, C. Gaylord Watkins as counsel, and Roger Cotton as associate counsel. Fahlgren was a mine manager and community leader in Red Lake, Ontario.

Studies in the commissions investigation included "Tourism Development in Ontario North of 50°", "The Future of Mineral Development in the Province of Ontario - North of 50" with 13, accompanying technical papers", "The People of the North - In Quest of Understanding", "The Story of the Kiashke River Native Development Inc.", "North of 50°: An Atlas of Far Northern Ontario", and "The Kayahna Region Land Utilization and Occupancy Study".

The report included an environmental impact analysis.

The Commission concluded that the "northern environment, the people who live there and their communities, are extremely vulnerable to the impacts of large scale resource development"  and these northern populations "do not have the capacity to influence the course of development". The report found that there were "no counter-balancing mechanisms in place to ensure that northerners benefit from development and that the northern environment is not irreparably harmed in the process." The report investigated the "potential of tourism, the tenuous position of the forest products industry and the forest resource base, mining activities, the conditions of the First Nations communities, as well as "public involvement in planning".

Reed Inc
When the commission was first established in 1977, Reed Ltd had intended to build a new pulp and paper mill. Through the "Reed Agreement", the Ontario government had the company the "largest tract of forest land ever given to a single company". By 1985, the new mill was "no longer an economic proposition". Great Lakes Forest Products Ltd—Reed's successor did not "require wood from the Reed tract for its Dryden mill complex." The Commission recommends that the Reed Agreement be "repudiated be repudiated" and "no part of the tract be licensed for cutting until the Commission's major recommendations with respect to the northern forest are implemented".

Mercury contamination in Grassy Narrows, Ontario, Canada

In regards to the mercury contamination of the river system used by the Grassy Narrows and White Dog First Nations "from which these communities derived employment and sustenance", the commission recommended that "until the claims of White Dog and Grassy Narrows are settled, the Government of Ontario should not grant any cutting rights to Great Lakes Forest Products Ltd., or any subsequent owner of the Dryden Mill Complex, in forest land outside existing company management units."

Notes

References

Water pollution in Canada
Royal commissions in Canada